Waigolshausen is a municipality  in the district of Schweinfurt in Bavaria, Germany.

References

Schweinfurt (district)